Walter Lawrence Barbare (August 11, 1891 – October 28, 1965) was an American baseball player who played in position third baseman/shortstop for the Cleveland Indians, Boston Red Sox, Pittsburgh Pirates, and Boston Braves.

In an eight-season career, Barbare was a .260 hitter with one home run and 156 RBI in 500 games played.

A solid infielder with a strong arm and a light bat, Barbare was a utility man with the Indians, Red Sox and Pirates in a span of six seasons. In 1921 he was sent to the Braves in the same trade that brought star shortstop Rabbit Maranville to Pittsburgh, and he responded with a career year, hitting .302 in 134 games.

Following his retirement as a player, Barbare served as a manager and umpire in the minor leagues.

Sources

Walter Barbare - Baseballbiography.com

Boston Braves players
Boston Red Sox players
Cleveland Naps players
Cleveland Indians players
Pittsburgh Pirates players
Major League Baseball third basemen
Major League Baseball shortstops
Sportspeople from Greenville, South Carolina
1891 births
1965 deaths
Baseball players from South Carolina
Minor league baseball managers
Greenville Spinners players
Asheville Mountaineers players
New Orleans Pelicans (baseball) players
Little Rock Travelers players
Jersey City Skeeters players
Toledo Mud Hens players
Memphis Chickasaws players